Chuck Chiasson (born 1958) is a Canadian politician, who was elected to the Legislative Assembly of New Brunswick in the 2014 provincial election. He represents the electoral district of Victoria-la-Vallée as a member of the Liberal Party.

Chiasson was named to the Select Committee on Cannabis, pursuant to Motion 31 of the 3rd session of the 58th New Brunswick Legislature.

Chiasson was re-elected in the 2018 and 2020 provincial elections.

Electoral Record

Victoria-La Vallée

References

Living people
New Brunswick Liberal Association MLAs
People from Victoria County, New Brunswick
21st-century Canadian politicians
1958 births